{{DISPLAYTITLE:C13H17NO2}}
The molecular formula C13H17NO2 (molar mass : 219.28 g/mol) may refer to:

 Alminoprofen
 Dimemebfe
 Methylenedioxyallylamphetamine, a psychedelic drug
 Pethidinic acid
 Ritalinic acid
 UWA-101